The name Battle of Arras refers to a number of battles which took place near the town of Arras in Artois, France:

Siege of Arras (1640), a siege by the French against the Spanish during the Thirty Years' War
Battle of Arras (1654), a clash between the French and the Spanish
Battle of Arras (1914), a battle during the Race to the Sea in the First World War
Battle of Arras (1915), took place on May 9, 1915, during the First World War
Battle of Arras (1917), a British Empire offensive during the First World War
Battle of Arras (1918), part of the Hundred Days Offensive
Battle of Arras (1940), a tank battle during the Battle of France in the Second World War

See also 
 Arras (disambiguation)